The Narrenturm (Fool's Tower) in Vienna is continental Europe's oldest building for the accommodation of psychiatric  patients. Built in 1784, it is next to the site of the old Vienna General Hospital, and is now home to the Federal Pathologic-Anatomical Museum Vienna (Pathologisch-anatomisches Bundesmuseum Wien).

The building 
The Narrenturm was constructed in 1784, under Emperor Joseph II, by Isidore Canevale. It consisted of a five-story, fortress-like circular building with 28 rooms and a ring of slit windows, plus a central chamber aligned north-to-south. There were in total 139 individual cells for the inmates. The building of the Narrenturm was prompted by the discovery of underground dungeons used by the Capuchin monks of Vienna for housing their mentally ill brethren; another factor was that Joseph II had learned about similar institutions in France during his travels there. The construction of the Narrenturm points to a new attitude towards the mentally ill – they began to be distinguished from the rest of society, and not simply classified among the general category of "the poor". Each cell had strong, barred doors as well as chains for restraining inmates.

By the late 1790s, the tower had been made fully obsolete by changes in the way psychiatric patients were treated. When it was first built, the Narrenturm had a lightning rod or "lightning catcher" installed on the roof ridge. In that time Václav Prokop Diviš, a clergyman in Přímětice near Znojmo, had studied plant growth and treatment with electrical currents present, publishing his findings to the medical community.

The museum 
The tower is currently home to the Federal Pathologic-Anatomical Museum, founded by Emperor Francis II in 1796 as the "Museum of the Pathologic-Anatomical Institute".  It has been a national museum (Bundesmuseum) since 1974.

See also 
 History of psychiatric institutions

References 

Former psychiatric hospitals
Museums in Vienna
Buildings and structures in Alsergrund
Museums established in 1971
Medical museums
Science museums in Austria
Medical and health organisations based in Austria